Bart Williams (September 18, 1949 – June 28, 2015) was an American character actor and documentary filmmaker. He was also an advocate and official for the Actors' Equity Association. Williams was a principal councilor on the Actors' Equity's Western Regional Board and National Council, as well as a member of the association's Membership Education and Hollywood Boulevard Theaters Committees.

Williams co-directed, produced, and wrote The Last First Comic, a 2010 documentary focusing on Irv Benson, who is believed to be the last surviving burlesque & Vaudeville comedian. Williams' documentary earned several awards from film festivals.

Williams died of cancer at his home in Bullhead City, Arizona, on June 28, 2015, at the age of 65.

References

External links

1949 births
2015 deaths
American male stage actors
American male film actors
American documentary film directors
American documentary film producers
People from Bullhead City, Arizona
Film directors from Arizona
Film producers from Arizona